The Trinidad and Tobago Police Service or TTPS is the law enforcement agency of Trinidad and Tobago. It has been in operation for over 200 years.

History

In 1592 the Spaniards founded the first European settlement, Trinidad's capital town San Jose de Oruna (St Joseph). The Office of the Cabildo or Town Council controlled the Police Force. Duties were restricted to within town. The strength of the Police Force never exceeded six between 1592 and 1792.

After slavery was abolished in 1838, and over 22,000 men and women enjoyed their full civil rights, the responsibility of the police increased and a ‘rural system of police’ had to be established. By the end of 1842 there were twelve police stations and approximately one hundred officers comprising inspectors, sergeants and constables.

In the mid 19th century members of the Metropolitan Police were brought to Trinidad on secondment, thus the Police Force had a very mixed composition as far as racial strains were concerned. During this period the Police Headquarters was housed at the corner of Abercromby and Hart Streets.

The only weapon the policeman carried was his truncheon which was four feet long. Then violence would be met with violence, and a local tradition of the police "beating first and arresting after" was formed. The general pattern of law enforcement in the 1840s was, once arrested the police took the accused to the station or if he was recalcitrant, held him and sent to call the sergeant. All police stations were Courthouses as Magistrates travelled from one Police Station to another. This was until 1844 when trial by jury and the English statutes were introduced into Trinidad.

In 1851 the police was appointed the country's first postmen and mail carriers and the police stations were transformed into Post Offices. The Mounted Branch was established for this purpose. In 1860 the Police Force was relieved of some of these extracurricular duties.

In 1869 an ordinance was initiated for better organisation and discipline of the Police Force. With a more organised Police Force, greater police surveillance of residents was provided.
The Police Headquarters at the corner of St. Vincent and Sackville Streets was completed in 1876 housing approximately four hundred and fifty–two (452) men. Over the years the strength increased and other units were established, such as Traffic Branch in 1930 and Special Branch.

By 1955 the need for policewomen to deal with juveniles and female offenders had long been overdue. Under Ordinance No. 6 of 195, twelve female officers were drafted into the Force.

A Commission of Enquiry was appointed by the government to probe the administration and discipline of the Police Service. In 1966 the then Governor General assented to the Police Service Act, which enacted the Police Service Regulation 1965. This Act divided the Service into two divisions - the first and second divisions. It also introduced a change from Police Force to Police Service. This change was not only in name but also in operation. The focus shifted from being a militaristic force to a service-oriented organization. The Police Service subsequently established a mission and vision statement:

By the 1970s the Police Service had grown in strength to 3,399 members and was placed under the portfolio of the Ministry of National Security. Mr. Francis Eustace Bernard was the first local to be appointed Commissioner of Police in 1973.

In 1881 the Police Headquarters was destroyed by fire which was caused by the kerosene oil lighting system. The Police Headquarters was destroyed for a second time in 1990, this time during the attempted coup. A new Police Administration Building was constructed at the corner of Edward and Sackville Streets the following year housing Administrative offices.

During the past two decades the strength of the service has grown to 6436 officers with several new specialist Units being introduced.

Uniforms

 Senior officers wear beige Khaki drill Guayabera shirts and trousers, worn with black Sam Browne Belts
 For formal dress, male officers wear white shirts and black trousers 
 For formal dress, female officers wear white shirts and dark blue skirts 
 None task-force or regular officers wear, grey shirts with dark blue trousers
 Females wear dark blue shirts with skirts or pants worn with black Sam Browne Belts
 Tactical/Task Force officers, wear, dark blue combat jacket and black tactical pants.
 Special Branch/Units officers wear digital-urban camouflage kits (BDU)

Firearm
TTPS uses different variety of weapons. some, which are for elite units. To name a few:

handguns: Sig Sauers', Glock 8| & More

Sub machine guns: Ump45, Sig Sauer MPX, MP5k, MP5A3, UZI, M4 Colt 9 by 19| & More

Assault rifles: Galil, AR15, H&K G36, H&K 416, SIG Sauer SIG 716| & More

Shot Guns: Benelli Shotgun-Semi-Automatic, KSG| & More

Rifles: Tactical Scout rifle| & More

See also 
 Crime in Trinidad and Tobago
 Jack Ewatski - former Deputy Commissioner of Police (DCP)

References

External links
 

Law of Trinidad and Tobago
Law enforcement in Trinidad and Tobago
Law enforcement agencies of Trinidad and Tobago